The Critical Eye Awards were created in 1990 by the Radio Nacional de España (RNE) program El Ojo Crítico. They recognize and promote the work of young talents, under 40 years of age, who have distinguished themselves in the preceding year in the modalities of plastic arts, narrative, poetry, film, theater, classical music, modern music, and dance. Since 1997, RNE has also presented the Special Critical Eye Award for an outstanding career. The Ibero-American Critical Eye Award has been presented biennially since 2014.

List of winners

Plastic Arts

References

External links
  

1990 establishments in Spain
Awards established in 1990
RTVE